Jean Adrien Philippe (April 16, 1815, La Bazoche-Gouet, Eure-et-Loir – January 5, 1894) was a French horologist and cofounder of watchmaker Patek Philippe & Co. of Geneva, Switzerland.

In 1842, Adrien Philippe invented a mechanism for watches which allowed them to be wound and set by means of a crown rather than a key. His patented invention earned him a Bronze Medal at the French Industrial Exposition of 1844 (World's Fair). At the Exhibition, Adrien Philippe first met Antoni Patek and a year later became head watchmaker at Patek & Co. in Geneva under an agreement that entitled him to one third of all company profits.

Adrien Philippe proved to be very capable at his craft and a product innovator whose value to the firm was such that by 1851 he was made a full partner and the firm began operating as Patek Philippe & Co. In 1863 he published a book in Geneva and Paris on the workings of  pocket watches titled Les montres sans clef.

His partner Antoni Patek died in 1877 and in 1891 the 76-year-old Adrien Philippe handed over the day-to-day management of the business to his son Joseph Emile Philippe and Francois Antoine Conty. 
 
Jean Adrien Philippe died in 1894 and was buried in St-Georges Cemetery in Geneva.

References

French company founders
Swiss company founders
French watchmakers (people)
Swiss-French people
1815 births
1894 deaths
19th-century French businesspeople
19th-century Swiss businesspeople
Swiss watchmakers (people)